Ọlámidé is a unisex given name of Yoruba origin meaning "a combination of prestige, success and wealth has arrived".

Some notable persons with this name include:
 Olamide Brown (born 1980s) British Nigerian physician and venture capitalist
 Olamide Gbenga Adedeji (born 1989), a Nigerian hip hop recording artist
 Olamide David, a Nigerian male child actor
 Olamide Faison (born 1983), an American actor and singer
 Olamide Shodipo (born 1997), an Irish professional footballer
 Olamide Zaccheaus (born 1997), an American football wide receiver

References

Yoruba given names
Unisex given names